St Dunstan's, Stepney, is an Anglican Church which stands on a site that has been used for Christian worship for over a thousand years. It is located in Stepney High Street, in Stepney, London Borough of Tower Hamlets.

History
In about AD 952, Dunstan, the Bishop of London — who was also Lord of the manor of Stepney — replaced the existing wooden structure with a stone church dedicated to All the Saints. In 1029, when Dunstan was canonised, the church was rededicated to St Dunstan and All Saints, a dedication it has retained. Like many subsequent Bishops, Dunstan may have lived in the Manor of Stepney.

The church is known as "The Mother Church of the East End" as the parish covered most of what would become inner East London, before population growth led to the creation of a large number of daughter parishes. This fission started in the fourteenth century or before.  Some of the earliest other churches built in the parish were Whitechapel and Bow; the former became an independent parish at an early date, while the latter was long a chapel of ease.

The existing building is the third on the site and was built of Kentish ragstone mainly in the fifteenth century (although the chancel dates from 200 years earlier).  A porch and octagonal parish room were added in 1872 by Arthur Shean Newman and Arthur Billing. The church was restored extensively in 1899 by Cutts and Cutts, at a cost of £5,600.  The vestries and some of the main building were destroyed by fire on 12 October 1901, including the organ which had carvings by Grinling Gibbons.  The restoration (again by Cutts and Cutts) cost £7,084,<ref name="Moon">The Morris Family of Philadelphia. Robert C. Moon. Vol. 4. pp. 17–23</ref> and the church was re-opened in June 1902 by the Bishop of Stepney (at that time Cosmo Gordon Lang). There was war-time damage, which was restored by Cyril Wontner-Smith. The church is Grade I listed

Bells
The ring of ten bells, the heaviest weighing 28¾ hundredweight, which hang in the belfry, were cast at the local Whitechapel Bell Foundry and are tuned to C#. The seven oldest bells were cast by Thomas Mears and Son, Whitechapel, in 1806.  The bells were re-hung in 1899.  Three were recast in 1952 when repairs were made to the tower. The bells are mentioned in the nursery rhyme Oranges and Lemons'': "When will that be, say the bells of Stepney."

Interior
A fine triple sedilia (priests' stone seating) is found in the chancel. The rood is late Anglo Saxon. Of note amongst the plate is a cup and paten dated 1559 and a beadle's staff  and verger's wand of 1752.

The organ was installed in 1971 by Noel Mander of Mander Organs. It is an 1872 Father Willis instrument built for St Augustine's, Haggerston, and rebuilt by R. Spurden Rutt & Co in 1926. It replaced a 1903 Norman and Beard organ, which is now located at St Edmund the King, Northwood Hills. In turn, that organ replaced the one destroyed in the 1901 fire, which was from 1678 and built by Renatus Harris, and had been rebuilt by Lewis & Co in 1900.

Churchyard
The church is surrounded by a churchyard of nearly seven acres (28,000 m2). In 1658 William Greenhill was appointed vicar whilst retaining his position as a preacher at Stepney Meeting House. He held this post for about seven years, till he was ejected immediately after the Restoration in 1660.

Shortly after this, the churchyard was enlarged to cope with the massive number of deaths during the Great Plague of London. In one eighteen-month period 6,583 died, with 154 being buried in one day in September 1665.

The church has a long, traditional link with the sea and many sailors were buried here. It was once known as the 'Church of the High Seas'. The graveyard is also where Roger Crab, the 17th-century hermit who lived on a diet solely of herbs, roots, leaves, grass and water, is buried.

The churchyard closed to burials in 1854. Between 1885 and 1887 high ground around the church was dug away, and the Metropolitan Public Gardens Association converted it to a public garden, designed by the MPGA's landscape gardener Fanny Wilkinson. The MPGA bore the cost of conversion at £3,000. The garden was opened by the Duchess of Leeds in 1887.

The railings, piers and gates to the churchyard are Grade II listed; the war memorial in the churchyard is also separately Grade II listed.

Current activities
The church continues to be open to visitors and worshippers from all over the world. There is an active congregation who help to continue the life of the church community. As well as the Arbour Centre (a St Dunstan's community project), there is a close connection with two schools: Stepney Greencoat Church of England Primary School and Stepney All Saints School. St Dunstan's also employs a Children and Community Worker funded by the Bishop of London's Mission Fund.

See also

 List of churches and cathedrals of London

References

External links
 St Dunstan and All Saints', Stepney
 The Arbour
 Sir John Cass and Redcoat Church of England Secondary School
 Stepney Greencoat Church of England Primary School

Stepney
Diocese of London
Grade I listed churches in London
Grade I listed buildings in the London Borough of Tower Hamlets
Stepney
Stepney